J Style is the second single-album by Lee Joon-gi produced with musician Kim Hyung Sunk. The album includes four new songs, including three songs from his previous album My Jun, My Style. One of the songs, "Selfless Dedicated Trees," was written by Lee's fans at the Episode II Mask fan meeting in April 2009. J Style reached the fist rank in the Hanteo and Mnet charts within the first week the album was released on April 21.

Track listing
Bold tracks are noted as the promotional tracks of the album.

  signifies a composer who is also the arranger.

Music video
For 5 months, Lee recorded an exclusive music video titled J Style for his upcoming Episode II 'Mask' fan meeting. Lee ran into trouble with the media where he had to deal with a blow after some important scenes were leaked out of the music video. The concept "Cyber Oriental" left the music video with a fantasy-like atmosphere and was highly different from his usual image. The stage backdrop had 5 different sets, and was also made with a big auto change stage mechanism. Lee worked with famed Korean producer, Kim Hyung Sunk, on this music video which was shown to the fans during his Episode II fan meeting on the April 18, 2009.

References

Dance music albums by South Korean artists
2009 albums
Pop albums by South Korean artists